Lettere is a comune (municipality) in the Metropolitan City of Naples in the southern central Italian region Campania, located about 30 km southeast of Naples.

Lettere borders the following municipalities: Angri, Casola di Napoli, Corbara, Gragnano, Ravello, Sant'Antonio Abate, Tramonti.
 
It was built near Ancient Liternum.

From 987 it was the see of a bishopric, which was renamed Roman Catholic Diocese of Lettere-Gragnano (viz.) from 1169 till its merger into the Diocese of Castellammare di Stabia. In 1968 it was nominally restored as Latin Titular bishopric of Lettere.

See also 
 List of Catholic dioceses in Italy

References

Sources and external links 
 GCatholic - residential and titular bishoppic

Cities and towns in Campania